The Embassy Lark is a radio comedy series broadcast from 1966 to 1968 as a spin-off from The Navy Lark.  It was written by Lawrie Wyman and starred Frank Thornton and Derek Francis.  It was produced by Sir Alistair Scott-Johnston.  Three series, of 13, 14 and 15 episodes, were made.

The show was set in the British Embassy in the fictional country of Tratvia and was concerned with the various (mis)adventures of the British Ambassador Sir Jeremy Crichton-Buller (Francis) and his First Secretary Henry Pettigrew (Thornton) as they tried to keep smooth relations between Tratvia, Whitehall and the other Embassies (China, the USSR and the U.S.).  Plots included a sudden requirement to hold a multinational concert in Tratvia with a major hydro-electric contract going to the best entertainment, a boundary dispute over oil fields and numerous examples of the Tratvian authorities attempting to get as much money or services from the Embassy staff as possible.  Although written as a broad farce and straight-ahead sitcom, there was thus an undercurrent of xenophobic satire also present.  Tratvia was an absolute monarchy, ruled by the fat and greedy, but always very sly, King Hildebrand III.  Although never specifically located, Tratvia seems likely to have been a loose parody of the Balkans.

Like all Wyman's comedy, a lot of mileage was gained from peculiar accents, with the other Ambassadors being the most frequent target.   Unlike later spin-off The Big Business Lark, there was a crossover between this and the parent series with Francis appearing in both series and Leslie Phillips making an appearance in his Navy Lark character of "silly ass" Sub-Lieutenant Phillips in the spin-off. Also in one episode, HMS Troutbridge visits Tratvia with Ronnie Barker as Commander Bell and Able Seaman Johnson, Stephen Murray as Lt Murray and Lawrie Wyman as Tiddy all reprising characters from The Navy Lark though there were no other characters from the previous series in the show. Richard Caldicot and Heather Chasen also both appeared in separate episodes though not as their Navy Lark characters.

Off-air recordings of all 42 episodes have survived and are readily available from Old Time Radio sites and newsgroups.  Occasional repeats have turned up on BBC Radio 4 Extra.

The episode "National Grumpschnog Week" has been released as an extra on the BBC's "Navy Lark Series 8" compendium of CDs.

Episodes
None of these episodes originally had titles. These titles are taken from the episode listings in the booklets for The Navy Lark CD sets.

Series 1 (1966)
Broadcast on Tuesdays at 7:31pm in the Light Programme.

Series 2 (1967)
Broadcast on Tuesdays at 9:00pm in the Light Programme, except for episodes 10-14, which were broadcast at 8:45pm.

Series 3 (1968)
Broadcast on Tuesdays at 8:45pm on Radio 1 and Radio 2, except for episode three, which was only broadcast on Radio 2.

References

External links
The Embassy Lark—the Embassy Lark page at a Navy Lark fansite.

BBC Radio comedy programmes
1966 radio programme debuts
1968 radio programme endings
BBC Radio 4 Extra programmes